Jung Jung-young (Hangul: 정정영; born 20 October 1986) is a South Korean badminton player who affiliate with Yone team since 2019. In 2004, he won the boys' doubles gold medal at the Asian Junior Championships and silver medal at the World Junior Championships partnered with Lee Yong-dae. He and Lee also won the 2004 Indonesia Junior tournament.

Achievements

World Junior Championships 
Boys' doubles

Asian Junior Championships 
Boys' doubles

BWF International Challenge/Series 
Men's doubles

Mixed doubles

  BWF International Challenge tournament
  BWF International Series tournament

References

External links 
 

1986 births
Living people
South Korean male badminton players